Rubén Iván Martínez Andrade (born 22 June 1984), known simply as Rubén, is a Spanish professional footballer who plays as a goalkeeper.

Club career
Born in Coristanco, Galicia, Rubén moved to FC Barcelona's youth academy in 1997, and reached the club's reserves five years later. As Turkey's Rüştü Reçber went on loan in the 2004–05 season he was handed the role of third choice in the first team, behind Víctor Valdés and Albert Jorquera.

On 18 December 2004, Rubén entered the pitch for Xavi after Valdés' dismissal in a 1–1 away draw against Valencia CF, and kept his place for the subsequent 2–1 La Liga win over Levante UD. After some more years in the B squad and an unassuming Segunda División loan at Racing de Ferrol (no games played, eventual relegation), he was released by Barcelona, joining FC Cartagena in the Segunda División B and going on to be an undisputed starter during his spell, promoting in the first season and nearly repeating the feat in the second.

Rubén was sold to Málaga CF on 25 August 2010, for €1.35 million. He made his competitive debut on 23 September, keeping a clean sheet in a 2–0 victory at Getafe CF. However, in late December, he fractured his right wrist in training – his second major physical ailment whilst at the club – being sidelined for the rest of the campaign and prompting the Andalusians to sign another goalkeeper in the winter transfer window, as Sergio Asenjo also suffered a severe injury (knee).

After a series of bad performances upon his recovery and also due to the managerial change at Málaga, Rubén lost his position to Willy Caballero, being further demoted to third choice after the club signed Carlos Kameni in January 2012. He was loaned to fellow league side Rayo Vallecano for the 2012–13 season.

Rubén returned to the Campo de Fútbol de Vallecas on 23 July 2013, signing a permanent one-year contract. On 28 May of the following year, he moved to UD Almería in the same league on a one-year deal.

On 2 June 2015, after suffering relegation with the Andalusians, Rubén agreed to a three-year contract with Levante UD. After again dropping down a tier, he joined Deportivo de La Coruña after cutting ties with the former.

Rubén was loaned to Belgian club R.S.C. Anderlecht in late January 2017, as Davy Roef moved in the opposite direction also on loan. He played his first match on 16 February, in a 2–0 home defeat of FC Zenit Saint Petersburg in the round of 32 of the UEFA Europa League which was also his first ever appearance in European competition.

On 5 July 2018, Rubén signed with CA Osasuna of the second division. He made 35 appearances for the champions in his first season and, in the summer of 2020, after contributing 19 to a tenth-place finish, put pen to paper to a one-year extension.

On 9 July 2021, Rubén joined Cypriot First Division club AEK Larnaca FC on a one-year deal.

International career
Rubén won his only cap for the Spain under-21 team on 16 November 2004, replacing Asier Riesgo for the final 17 minutes of the 1–0 friendly win against England held in Alcalá de Henares.

Career statistics

Honours
Barcelona
La Liga: 2004–05

Anderlecht
Belgian First Division A: 2016–17

Osasuna
Segunda División: 2018–19

Spain U23
Mediterranean Games: 2005

Spain U20
FIFA U-20 World Cup runner-up: 2003

References

External links

1984 births
Living people
People from Bergantiños
Sportspeople from the Province of A Coruña
Spanish footballers
Footballers from Galicia (Spain)
Association football goalkeepers
La Liga players
Segunda División players
Segunda División B players
Tercera División players
FC Barcelona C players
FC Barcelona Atlètic players
FC Barcelona players
Racing de Ferrol footballers
FC Cartagena footballers
Málaga CF players
Rayo Vallecano players
UD Almería players
Levante UD footballers
Deportivo de La Coruña players
CA Osasuna players
Belgian Pro League players
R.S.C. Anderlecht players
Cypriot First Division players
AEK Larnaca FC players
Spain youth international footballers
Spain under-21 international footballers
Spain under-23 international footballers
Competitors at the 2005 Mediterranean Games
Mediterranean Games medalists in football
Mediterranean Games gold medalists for Spain
Spanish expatriate footballers
Expatriate footballers in Belgium
Expatriate footballers in Cyprus
Spanish expatriate sportspeople in Belgium
Spanish expatriate sportspeople in Cyprus